The 2008–09 Wessex Football League was the 23rd season of the Wessex Football League. The league champions for the first time in their history were Poole Town, who were denied promotion to the Southern League due to ground grading problems. VT were promoted as runners-up. There was the usual programme of promotion and relegation between the two Wessex League divisions.

For sponsorship reasons, the league was known as the Sydenhams Wessex League.

League tables

Premier Division
The Premier Division consisted of 22 clubs, reduced from 23 the previous season, after A.F.C. Totton were promoted to the Southern League, and Downton and Ringwood Town were relegated to Division One. Two new clubs joined:
Laverstock & Ford, runners-up in Division One.
Newport (IOW), relegated from the Southern League.

Division One
Division One consisted of 21 clubs, the same as the previous season, after Laverstock & Ford were promoted to the Premier Division, and Liss Athletic left the league. Two clubs were relegated from the Premier Division:
Downton
Ringwood Town

References

Wessex Football League seasons
9